The imaginifer was one of the signiferi in a legion in the times of the Roman Empire, who carried the imago (the image) of the emperor.

The imaginifer  was added to the ranks of the legions when the Imperial cult was first established during the reign of Augustus. The image was a three-dimensional portrait made from beaten metal. It was carried only in the leading cohort.

See also
Aquilifer
Vexillarius
Draconarius

References

Military ranks of ancient Rome
Ancient Roman titles